Greatest Hits III is a compilation album by British rock band Queen. It is a compilation of latter-day songs, the band members' solo hits and the band's collaborations with other artists (hence the album's credit to "Queen+"). It was released on 8 November 1999.  The first two tracks on the album were new previously unreleased versions of classic Queen songs.

The album includes "These Are the Days of Our Lives" (1991), which was Freddie Mercury's last appearance in a music video, and "No-One but You (Only the Good Die Young)" (1997), a song dedicated to Mercury which also features the last recording of bass guitarist John Deacon before his retirement. Four songs from their last studio album Made in Heaven (1995) also feature in the compilation, including "Too Much Love Will Kill You" and "Heaven for Everyone".

Track listing 
Unless otherwise indicated, Information is based on the album's Liner Notes

Personnel 
Information is based on the album's Liner Notes
Main
Queen - producers (2, 4-8, 11, 13, 15-17)
Brian May - producer (9), remixing (2)
Freddie Mercury - producer (3, 12), original recording producer (10)
Roger Taylor - remixing (2)
David Bowie - producer (2)
Wyclef Jean - remixing (14)
Mack - producer (8, 13, 17), original recording producer (10)
George Michael - producer (5)

Additional 
Joshua J. Macrae - producer (6-7, 11), recording engineer (11, 15), additional remixing (2)
Mike Moran - producer (3, 12)
Colin Peter - producer, recording engineer (10)
Serge Ramaekers - producer, recording engineer (10)
Julian Raymond - additional production (10)
David Richards - producer (3-4, 6-7, 9, 12, 16), recording engineer (5)
Justin Shirley-Smith - producer (6-7, 11), recording engineer (1, 11, 15), additional remixing (2)
Carl Ward - producer, recording engineer (10)

Charts

Certifications

References

External links
 Queen official website: Discography: Greatest Hits III: includes lyrics of "Under Pressure (Rah Mix)", "Barcelona", "Las Palabras De Amor", "Driven By You", "Living On My Own", "The Great Pretender", "Thank God It’s Christmas."

Queen (band) compilation albums
1999 greatest hits albums
Hollywood Records compilation albums
Parlophone compilation albums
Albums produced by Jerry Duplessis